The genus Epiophlebia is the sole member of the family Epiophlebiidae, which is itself the sole living representative of the Epiproctan infraorder Epiophlebioptera, and it contains only three species. The first two species were historically placed in their own suborder Anisozygoptera, considered intermediate between dragonflies and damselflies, mainly because the hind wings are very similar in size and shape to the forewings and held back over the body at rest, as in damselflies. It has more recently been recognized that the genus Epiophlebia shares a more recent ancestor with dragonflies (having become separated from these in and around the uplifting of the Himalayas), and the group has accordingly been reclassified as an infraorder within the dragonflies. Very recently a third species, Epiophlebia sinensis, has been described from Heilongjiang province in northeast China, bridging Epiophlebia distribution gap between Nepal and Japan. A fourth species has been claimed from larval material from South China, but this is not universally accepted. Epiophlebia species are a freshwater indicator of a river ecosystem health. A study that has been conducted on the head anatomy of Epiophlebia has verified the presence of 41 muscles in the head of the larva. Like in true dragonflies (Anisoptera) the aquatic nymphs breathe through a rectal chamber, but jet propulsion has yet to be documented. Epiophlebia species are a representative of a dragonfly fauna which originated during the Jurassic period on the rising continent of Eurasia.

Cited references

Dragonflies
Odonata genera